Victoria Horne (November 1, 1911 – October 10, 2003) was an American character actress, appearing in 49 films (uncredited in 25 of these) during the 1940s and 1950s.

Early years
Horne was born on November 1, 1911, in New York City, to Ignatz Hornstein (who emigrated from Braila, Romania) and Mary Louise Schoenwetter Hornstein. She was the second of four children. The family name was changed to "Horne" when she was a child. 

She was a graduate of the American Academy of Dramatic Arts.

Career

The films in which she appeared included Blue Skies, The Ghost and Mrs. Muir, and Abbott and Costello Meet the Killer, Boris Karloff. Perhaps her best-known film roles were as James Stewart's love-searching niece Myrtle Mae Simmons in the 1950 film adaptation of Mary Chase's play Harvey, as Roberta in the 1952 Three Stooges short subject Cuckoo on a Choo Choo, and as Nabura, a villainous Japanese agent in the 1945 serial Secret Agent X-9.

Personal life
She married actor Jack Oakie in 1950 and remained with him until his death on January 23, 1978. After his death, she arranged the posthumous publication of her late husband's book, Jack Oakie's Double Takes and also published a number of other books about him. 

Victoria and Jack Oakie lived their entire married life at "Oakridge", their  estate at 18650 Devonshire Street (just west of Reseda Boulevard) in Northridge, Los Angeles, California. Victoria Oakie continued to live there after her husband's death and bequeathed the estate to the University of Southern California. After two failed attempts to develop the property, Oakridge was acquired by the City of Los Angeles.  The city plans to use the property as a park and community event center. Oakridge was originally commissioned by Barbara Stanwyck and designed by Paul Williams, and is considered to be one of the last remnants of the large Northridge estates famed for thoroughbred breeding. The house and grounds are Los Angeles Historic-Cultural Monument #484.

Death
Horne died on October 10, 2003, in a retirement home in Beverly Hills, California. She was 91. She is interred in Forest Lawn Memorial Park in Glendale, California.

Legacy
The Jack Oakie and Victoria Horne Oakie Charitable Foundation underwrites "lectures on comedy and scholarships for deserving film and theater students at some of the most prestigious institutions in the country." An official of Syracuse University said that money provided by the foundation "was a godsend" in helping the university establish its semester-in-Los-Angeles program.

Filmography

References

Bibliography
  Autobiography published posthumously by Oakie's widow on January 1, 1980. 240 pages.
  A history of the Oakie family home, "Oakridge". 126 pages.
  Letters of congratulation and reminiscence sent from almost 150 celebrities to Jack Oakie in celebration of his 70th birthday. Compiled & edited by Mrs Oakie to commemorate his 90th birthday. 140 pages.

External links

 

 Aerial view of the Jack Oakie and Victoria Horne "Oakridge" estate - (circa 2006-07)
 

1911 births
2003 deaths
20th-century American actresses
American film actresses
Actresses from California
People from Northridge, Los Angeles
21st-century American women